The Second Historical Archives of China (SHAC) is located on 309 East Zhongshan Rd., Nanjing, Jiangsu, China.

History
The Second Historical Archives are held in the relic of West Palace of the Ming dynasty. The Archives were founded in February 1951, and originally named Nanjing Historical Documents Management Bureau. From 1964, it became affiliated to the State Archives Administration of the People's Republic of China, and was renamed 'The Second Historical Archives'.

The Second Historical Archives of China collect archives of former central governments during the Republic of China period (1912–1949), including the governments in Nanjing, Guangzhou, Wuhan and Beijing. It also holds the archive of the government led by Wang Jingwei during the Japanese occupation era. In addition, there are a large quantity of documents concerning celebrities and senior officers of the Kuomintang in modern China.

The archives have recently announced that they are severely restricting access to files from October 2008 onwards, as part of a comprehensive digitalization program that aims to restrict access only to digitized files.

Transportation
The area is accessible within walking distance west of Minggugong Station of Nanjing Metro.

References

External links
 Official website of the Second Historical Archives of China

Buildings and structures in Nanjing
Archives in China
1951 establishments in China
Republic of China (1912–1949)